The German  system (literally "compartment" or "subject of study", here in the sense of "vocal specialization") is a method of classifying singers, primarily opera singers, according to the range, weight, and color of their voices. It is used worldwide, but primarily in Europe, especially in German-speaking countries and by repertory opera houses.

The  system is a convenience for singers and opera houses. It prevents singers from being asked to sing roles which they are incapable of performing. Opera companies keep lists of available singers by  so that when they are casting roles for an upcoming production, they do not inadvertently contact performers who would be inappropriate for the part.

Where possible, an English and/or Italian equivalent of each  is listed; however, not all  have ready English or Italian equivalents. Note that some roles can be sung by more than one  and that many singers do not easily fit into a : for instance some sopranos may sing both  and  roles. In addition, roles traditionally more difficult to cast may be given to a voice other than the traditional . For instance, the "Queen of the Night" and "Violetta" are more traditionally dramatic coloratura roles, but it is difficult to find a dramatic coloratura to sing it (particularly given the extreme range). Therefore, these roles are often sung by a lyric coloratura.

Soprano

English equivalent: coloratura soprano or lyric coloratura soprano
 Range: From about middle C (C4) to the F two-and-a-half octaves above middle C (F6)
 Description: Usually (but not always) a light soprano who has a high voice. Can often have small voices lacking the richness and resonance of a dramatic soprano. Must be able to do fast acrobatics with easy high notes. Many have extremely high ranges (with notes above the F of the "Queen of the Night"), but there are also singers in this  who do not regularly sing higher than the high E6.
 Roles:
 Adina, L'elisir d'amore (Gaetano Donizetti)
 Aminta, Die schweigsame Frau (Richard Strauss)
 Blonde, Die Entführung aus dem Serail (Wolfgang Amadeus Mozart)
 Cunegonde, Candide (Leonard Bernstein)
 Frasquita, Carmen (Bizet)
 Juliette, Roméo et Juliette (Gounod)
 Marie, La fille du régiment (Gaetano Donizetti)
 Olympia, Les contes d'Hoffman (Jacques Offenbach)
 Oscar, Un ballo in maschera (Giuseppe Verdi)
 Zerbinetta, Ariadne auf Naxos (Richard Strauss)

English equivalent: Dramatic coloratura soprano
Range: From about middle C (C4) to the F two and a half octaves above middle C (F6)
Description: The same as above, only with a more dramatic, rich voice. Often heavier and more lyrical than a coloratura soprano. Must also be able to do fast vocal acrobatics and reach high notes, such as the F6 of the "Queen of the Night".
Roles:
Abigalle, Nabucco (Giuseppe Verdi)
Donna Anna, Don Giovanni (Wolfgang Amadeus Mozart)
Elvira, I puritani (Vincenzo Bellini)
Fiordiligi, Così fan tutte (Wolfgang Amadeus Mozart)
 Gilda, Rigoletto (Giuseppe Verdi)
Konstanze, Die Entführung aus dem Serail (Wolfgang Amadeus Mozart)
Leonora, Il trovatore (Giuseppe Verdi)
Norma, Norma (Vincenzo Bellini)
Odabella, Attila (Giuseppe Verdi)
The Queen of the Night, Die Zauberflöte (Wolfgang Amadeus Mozart)
Violetta, La traviata (Giuseppe Verdi)
One must not mistake the Mozartian dramatic coloratura soprano with the Italian dramatic coloratura soprano. A singer that sings Konstanze, Donna Anna or Fiordiligi can not necessarily sing the Italian dramatic coloratura parts, due to other vocal demands. Imogene, Leonora and Violetta require a dramatic soprano voice and are most often sung by dramatic sopranos with an agile voice that can easily produce coloratura and high notes. Roles like Norma, Lady Macbeth, Odabella or Abigaille are good examples of Italian roles that are not necessarily a coloratura soprano (even though the score calls for coloratura singing), but a full bodied dramatic soprano with a voice that can handle extreme dramatic singing and that is flexible enough to sing coloratura. Giuseppe Verdi wrote many parts like this in his early years.

English equivalent: Soubrette
 Range: From about middle C (C4) to the C two octaves above middle C (C6)
 Description: A beautiful, sweet light lyric voice usually capable of executing florid passages similarly to that of a coloratura. The range is usually intermediate between that of a coloratura and lyric soprano. Most sopranos start out as soubrettes, changing fach as the voice matures.
 Roles: 
 Adele, Die Fledermaus (J. Strauss II) 
 Barbarina, Le nozze di Figaro (Wolfgang Amadeus Mozart)
 Clotilde, Norma (Vincenzo Bellini)
 Despina, Così fan tutte (Wolfgang Amadeus Mozart)
 Echo, Ariadne auf Naxos (Richard Strauss)
 Papagena, Die Zauberflöte (Wolfgang Amadeus Mozart)
 Servilia, La clemenza di Tito (Wolfgang Amadeus Mozart)
 Sophie, Der Rosenkavalier (Richard Strauss)
 Susanna, Le nozze di Figaro (Wolfgang Amadeus Mozart)
 Zerlina, Don Giovanni (Wolfgang Amadeus Mozart)

English equivalent: lyric soprano
 Range: From about B below middle C (B3) to the C two octaves above middle C (C6)
 Description: A more supple soprano, capable of legato, portamento, and some agility; generally has a more soulful and sensuous quality than a soubrette, who tends to be largely flirtatious and somewhat tweety. The voice is very common; thus the purity and character of the basic timbre is essential. It is the "basic" soprano voice which is at neither extremes of the soprano range of voices; it is not known for having particular vocal attributes such as power, stamina, technical prowess, or agility. However, there are several lyric sopranos that possess a quantity of many of these vocal attributes, thus allowing them to sing a broader variety of roles. Nevertheless, the core of the true fundamentally lyric voice does not encompass such traits. Innocence, vulnerability and pathos are usually conveyed in the music written for the characters portrayed by the lyric soprano because of this endearing simplicity. This fach is also famous because the voices usually remain especially fresh until advanced age.
 Roles:
 Antonia, Les contes d'Hoffman (Jacques Offenbach)
 Gretel, Hänsel und Gretel (Engelbert Humperdinck)
 Lauretta, Gianni Schicchi  (Giacomo Puccini)
 Liù, Turandot (Giacomo Puccini)
 Musetta, La Boheme (Giacomo Puccini)
 Micaëla, Carmen (Georges Bizet)
 Pamina, Die Zauberflöte (Wolfgang Amadeus Mozart)
 Rusalka, Rusalka (Antonín Dvořák)
 Sophie, Werther (Jules Massenet)
 Susanna, Le nozze di Figaro (Wolfgang Amadeus Mozart)

English equivalent: lyric dramatic soprano
 Range: From about A below middle C (A3) to the C two octaves above middle C (C6)
 Description: The Italian version of this fach is the spinto, which literally translated means pushed. However this is not accurate in terms of these singers' vocal production. A lyric dramatic soprano has a lyric instrument that can also create big sounds, cutting through an orchestral or choral climax. This voice is sometimes referred to as a "young" or "youthful" dramatic soprano although this term doesn't necessarily refer to the singer's age but rather to the tonal quality of the voice. This fach is more clearly delineated in the German system than in the American system. Depending on the singer, however, this voice type can be versatile, as it lies at neither extreme of the soprano spectrum. Spintos are occasionally able to take on lighter mezzo roles or conversely, lyric and even coloratura roles.
 Roles:
 Agathe, Der Freischütz (Carl Maria von Weber)
 Amelia, Un ballo in maschera (Giuseppe Verdi)
 Chrysothemis, Elektra (Richard Strauss)
 Cio-Cio San, Madama Butterfly (Giacomo Puccini)
 Donna Elvira, Don Giovanni (Wolfgang Amadeus Mozart)
 Elisabeth, Tannhäuser (Richard Wagner)
 Elsa, Lohengrin (Richard Wagner)
 Maddalena, Andrea Chénier (Umberto Giordano)
 Magda Sorel, The Consul (Gian Carlo Menotti)
 Marie, Wozzeck (Alban Berg)
 Marie/Marietta, Die tote Stadt (Erich Wolfgang Korngold)
 Suor Angelica, Suor Angelica (Giacomo Puccini)

English equivalent: full dramatic soprano
 Range: From about the A below middle C (A3) to the C two octaves above middle C (C6)
 Description: Characterized by their rich, full sounding voices, dramatic sopranos are expected to project across large orchestras, a feat that requires a powerful sound. Dramatic sopranos are not expected to have the vocal flexibility of the lighter . Although most dramatic sopranos have a darker, more robust quality to the voice, there are some that possess a lighter lyrical tone. In these instances, however, the substantial amount of volume and endurance normally associated with the dramatic soprano voice is still present. The darker voiced dramatic soprano may even make a foray into the dramatic mezzo-soprano territory with great success.
 Roles:
 Ariadne, Ariadne auf Naxos (Richard Strauss)
 Cassandre, Les Troyens (Hector Berlioz)
 Elektra,  Elektra (Richard Strauss)
 La Gioconda,  La Gioconda (Amilcare Ponchielli)
 Leonore, Fidelio (Ludwig van Beethoven)
 Minnie, La fanciulla del West (Giacomo Puccini)
 Santuzza, Cavalleria rusticana (Pietro Mascagni)
 Sieglinde, Die Walküre (Wagner)
 Tosca, Tosca (Giacomo Puccini)
 Turandot, Turandot (Giacomo Puccini)

English equivalent: High dramatic soprano
 Range: From about the F below middle C (F3) to the C two octaves above middle C (C6)
 Description: A voice capable of answering the demands of operas of Wagner's maturity. The voice is substantial, very powerful, and even throughout the registers. It is immense, stentorian and even larger than the voice of the "normal" dramatic soprano. Although the two voices are comparable and are sometimes hard to distinguish between, this voice has even greater stamina, endurance and volume than the former. The top register is very strong, clarion and bright. Successful  are rare.
 Roles:
 Desdemona, Otello (Giuseppe Verdi)
 Eva, Die Meistersinger von Nürnberg (Richard Wagner)
 Helmwige, Die Walküre (Richard Wagner)
 Giulietta, Les contes d'Hoffman (Jacques Offenbach)
 Liza, The Queen of Spades (Pyotr Ilyich Tchaikovsky)
 Marschallin, Der Rosenkavalier (Richard Strauss)
 Mimi, La bohème (Giacomo Puccini)
 Salome, Salome (Richard Strauss)
 Woglinde, Das Rheingold and Götterdämmerung (Richard Wagner)
 The woodbird, Siegfried (Richard Wagner)

Mezzo-soprano

English equivalent: coloratura mezzo-soprano
 Range: From about the G below middle C (G3) to the B two octaves above middle C (B5)
 Description: Found especially in Rossini's operas, these roles were written originally for altos with agility and secure top notes. Today they are often played by mezzo-sopranos and sometimes even by sopranos. At times a lyric or full lyric soprano with a flexible voice will assume the roles as written while a true coloratura soprano will sing the same music transposed  to a higher key.
 Roles:
 Angelina, La Cenerentola (Gioachino Rossini)
 Griselda, Griselda (Vivaldi)
 Isabella, L'italiana in Algeri (Gioachino Rossini)
 Isolier, Le comte Ory (Rossini)
 Julius Caesar, Giulio Cesare (Handel)
 Orsini, Lucrezia Borgia (Donizetti)
 Romeo, I Capuleti e i Montecchi (Vincenzo Bellini)
 Ruggiero, Alcina (Handel)
 Rosina, Il barbiere di Siviglia (Gioachino Rossini)
 Tancredi, Tancredi (Gioacchino Rossini)

Range: From about the G below middle C (G3) to the B two octaves above middle C (B5)
 English equivalent: lyric mezzo-soprano
 Description: A lyric mezzo soprano's instrument in a lower range; the resulting sound is less piercing, more lachrymose and rather sensitive. The voices are similar, giving rise to the term 'short soprano' i.e. a soprano without the highest notes. In fact, many lyric mezzos with strong extensions to their upper vocal registers make the transition to singing as sopranos at some point in their careers.
 Roles:
 Charlotte, Werther (Massenet)
 Cherubino, Le nozze di Figaro (Wolfgang Amadeus Mozart)
 Dorabella, Così fan tutte (Wolfgang Amadeus Mozart)
 Hänsel, Hänsel und Gretel (Engelbert Humperdinck)
 Marguerite, La damnation de Faust (Berlioz)
 Meg, Little Women (Mark Adamo)
 Mignon, Mignon (Ambroise Thomas)
 Nicklausse, Les contes d'Hoffman (Offenbach)
 Mother, Amahl and the Night Visitors (Menotti)
 Suzuki, Madama Butterfly (Giacomo Puccini)

English equivalent: dramatic mezzo-soprano
 Range: From about the G below middle C (G3) to the B two octaves above middle C (B5)
 Description: Dramatic mezzo-sopranos have ranges very similar to a dramatic soprano. The main difference is the endurance and ease in which the two voice-types sing – a mezzo will concentrate singing most of the time in her middle and low registers and will go up to notes like high B-flat only at the dramatic climax. Consequently, many dramatic mezzo-sopranos have success in singing some dramatic soprano roles that are written with a lower tessitura.
 Roles:
 Amneris, Aida (Giuseppe Verdi) 
 Dido, Les Troyens (Hector Berlioz)
 The Composer, Ariadne auf Naxos (Richard Strauss)
 Dalila, Samson et Dalila (Camille Saint-Saëns)
 Eboli, Don Carlo (Giuseppe Verdi)
 Fricka, Das Rheingold, Die Walküre (Richard Wagner)
 Gertrud, Hänsel und Gretel (Engelbert Humperdinck)
 Klytaemnestra, Elektra (Richard Strauss)
 Octavian, Der Rosenkavalier (Richard Strauss)
 Ortrud, Lohengrin (Richard Wagner)

Contralto

English equivalent: dramatic contralto
 Range: From about the F below middle C (F3) to the G or A two octaves above (G–A5)
 Description: Stylistically similar to the dramatic mezzo, just lower. Sings usually around the break between the chest voice and middle voice. Many mezzos tried their luck in these roles, yet real altos fare better. A deep, penetrating low female voice. This is a very rare voice type with a darker, richer sound than that of a typical alto.
 Roles:
 Azucena, Il trovatore (Verdi)
 Carmen, Carmen (Bizet)
 La Cieca, La Gioconda (Ponchielli)
 Dryade, Ariadne auf Naxos (Richard Strauss)
 Erda, Das Rheingold, Siegfried (Wagner)
 Maddalena, Rigoletto (Verdi)
 A norn, Götterdämmerung (Wagner)
 Polina, The Queen of Spades (Tchaikovsky)
 Schwertleite, Die Walküre (Wagner)
 Ulrica, Un ballo in maschera (Verdi)

English equivalent: low contralto
 Range: From about the E below middle C (E3) to the E two octaves above (E5)
 Description: A low female voice.
 Roles:
 Anna, Les Troyens (Hector Berlioz)
 Annina, Der Rosenkavalier (Richard Strauss)
 Antonia's mother, Tales of Hoffmann (Jacques Offenbach)
 Bradamante, Alcina (Handel)
 Didone, Egisto (Cavalli)
 Gaea, Daphne (Richard Strauss)
 Geneviève, Pelléas et Mélisande (Claude Debussy)
 Hippolyta, A Midsummer Night's Dream (Britten)
 Marthe, Faust (Charles Gounod)
 Zita, Gianni Schicchi (Giacomo Puccini)

Tenor

/ Tenor buffo 

 English equivalent: (lyric) comic tenor. It is quite possible for a young  to eventually work into the lighter  category; the deciding factor will be the beauty of voice.
 Range: From about low C (C3) to the B an octave above middle C (B4)
 Roles:
 Monostatos, Die Zauberflöte (Wolfgang Amadeus Mozart)
 Pedrillo, Die Entführung aus dem Serail (Wolfgang Amadeus Mozart)

English equivalent: character tenor; must have good acting abilities.
 Range: From about the B below low C (B2) to the C an octave above middle C (C5)

English equivalent: lyric tenor
 Range: From about low C (C3) to the C an octave above middle C (C5)
 Roles:
 Alfredo, La traviata (Giuseppe Verdi)
 Almaviva, Il barbiere di Siviglia (Gioachino Rossini)
 Belmonte, Die Entführung aus dem Serail (Wolfgang Amadeus Mozart)
 Don Ottavio, Don Giovanni (Wolfgang Amadeus Mozart)
 Il Duca, Rigoletto (Giuseppe Verdi)
 Lindoro, L'italiana in Algeri (Gioachino Rossini)
 Nemorino, L'elisir d'amore (Gaetano Donizetti)
 Ramiro, La Cenerentola (Gioachino Rossini)
 Tamino, Die Zauberflöte (Wolfgang Amadeus Mozart)

English equivalent: lyric dramatic tenor also known as Spinto
 Range: From about low C (C3) to the C an octave above middle C (C5)
 Description: A tenor with a dramatic extended upper range with the necessary brightness to come through the orchestra's texture.
 Roles:
 Calaf, Turandot (Giacomo Puccini)
 Canio, Pagliacci (Ruggero Leoncavallo)
 Cavaradossi, Tosca (Giacomo Puccini)
 Dick Johnson, La fanciulla del West (Giacomo Puccini)
 Don Alvaro, La forza del destino (Giuseppe Verdi)
 Don José, Carmen (Georges Bizet)
 Florestan, Fidelio (Ludwig van Beethoven)
 Idomeneo, Idomeneo (Wolfgang Amadeus Mozart)
 Lohengrin, Lohengrin (Richard Wagner)
 Manrico, Il trovatore (Giuseppe Verdi)
 Max, Der Freischütz (Carl Maria von Weber)
 Radamès, Aida (Giuseppe Verdi)
 Siegmund, Die Walküre (Richard Wagner)

English equivalent: heroic tenor or dramatic tenor
 Range: From about the B below low C (B2) to the C above middle C (C5)
 Description: A full dramatic tenor with baritonal facility in the middle range and the brightness necessary to pierce a thick orchestral texture.
 Roles:
 Otello, Otello (Giuseppe Verdi)
 Siegfried, Der Ring des Nibelungen (Richard Wagner)
 Tristan, Tristan und Isolde (Richard Wagner)
 Tannhäuser, Tannhäuser (Richard Wagner)
 Walther von Stolzing, Die Meistersinger (Richard Wagner)

Baritone

/  
 Italian: baritono leggero
 English equivalent: light baritone
 Range: From the low C (C3) to the B above middle C (B4)
 Description: The Baryton-Martin, named after Jean-Blaise Martin (sometimes referred to as Light Baritone) lacks the lower G2–B2 range a heavier baritone is capable of, and has a lighter, almost tenor-like quality.

Italian: baritono lirico
 English equivalent: lyric baritone
 Range: From about the B below low C (B2) to the A above middle C (A4)
 Description: A sweet, mild sounding baritone voice, lacking harshness. Many lyric baritone roles call for some fioritura and coloratura, a beautiful line, as well as a charismatic presence.
 Roles:
 Albert, Werther (Jules Massenet)
 Belcore, L'elisir d'amore (Gaetano Donizetti)
 Billy Budd, Billy Budd (Benjamin Britten)
 Dottore Malatesta, Don Pasquale (Gaetano Donizetti)
 Figaro, Il barbiere di Siviglia (Gioachino Rossini)
 Guglielmo, Così fan tutte (Wolfgang Amadeus Mozart)
 Papageno, Die Zauberflöte (Wolfgang Amadeus Mozart)

Italian: baritono cantabile
 English equivalent: cavalier baritone
 Range: From about the A below low C (A2) to the G above middle C (G4)
 Description: A metallic voice, that can sing both lyric and dramatic phrases, a manly noble baritonal color; most on-stage roles in this Fach call for good looks.
 Roles:
 Conte Almaviva, Le nozze di Figaro (Wolfgang Amadeus Mozart)
 Count, Capriccio (Richard Strauss)
 Don Giovanni, Don Giovanni (Wolfgang Amadeus Mozart)
 Escamillo, Carmen (Georges Bizet)
 Ford, Falstaff (Giuseppe Verdi)
 Lescaut, Manon Lescaut (Giacomo Puccini)
 Lord Enrico Ashton, Lucia di Lammermoor (Gaetano Donizetti)
 Marcello, La bohème (Giacomo Puccini)
 Onegin, Eugene Onegin (Pyotr Ilyich Tchaikovsky)
 Rodrigo de Posa, Don Carlo (Giuseppe Verdi)
 Sharpless, Madama Butterfly (Giacomo Puccini)
 Valentin, Faust (Charles Gounod)
 Wolfram von Eschenbach, Tannhäuser (Richard Wagner)

Italian: baritono verdiano
 English equivalent: Verdi baritone
 Range: From about the A below low C (A2) to the G above middle C (G4)
 Description: A voice particularly effective with passages in its higher reaches. A high tessitura vis-a-vis the range extremes. A Verdi baritone refers to a voice capable of singing consistently and with ease in the highest part of the baritone range, sometimes extending up to the C above middle C (C5 or high C). The Verdi baritone will generally have a lot of squillo, or "ping"
 Roles:
 Scarpia, Tosca (Giacomo Puccini)
 Wozzeck (title role) (Alban Berg)

Italian: baritono drammatico
 English equivalent: dramatic baritone
 Range: From about the G below low C (G2) to the F above middle C (F4)
 Description: Means 'heroic baritone'. In the German opera houses a true  is a prized possession: a singer with exciting power and an authoritative mature sound and production.
 Roles:
 Alfio, Cavalleria rusticana (Pietro Mascagni)
 Amonasro, Aida (Giuseppe Verdi)
 Dr Schön / Jack the Ripper, Lulu (Alban Berg)
 Ezio, Attila (Giuseppe Verdi)
 Gérard, Andrea Chénier (Umberto Giordano)
 Iago, Otello (Giuseppe Verdi)
 Jack Rance, La fanciulla del West (Giacomo Puccini)
 Jochanaan, Salome (Richard Strauss)
 Macbeth (title role) (Giuseppe Verdi)
 Michele, Il tabarro (Giacomo Puccini)
 Don Pizarro, Fidelio (Ludwig van Beethoven)
 Simon Boccanegra (title role) (Giuseppe Verdi)
 Telramund, Lohengrin (Richard Wagner)
 Tonio, Pagliacci (Ruggero Leoncavallo)

/ Low lyric baritone 

 English equivalent: lyric bass-baritone
 Range: From about the G below low C (G2) to the F above middle C (F4)
 Description: The bass-baritone's required range can vary tremendously based on the role, with some less demanding than others. Some bass-baritones are baritones, while others are basses.

/ Low dramatic baritone 

 English equivalent: dramatic bass-baritone
 Range: From about the G below low C (G2) to the F above middle C (F4)

Bass

Basso cantante / Lyric bass-bariton / High lyric bass 

 English equivalent: lyric bass-baritone or singing bass
 Range: From about the E below low C (E2) to the F above middle C (F4)
 Basso cantante means 'singing bass'.

/ Dramatic bass-baritone / High dramatic bass 

 English equivalent: dramatic bass-baritone
 Range: From about the E below low C (E2) to the F above middle C (F4)

English equivalent: young bass
 Range: From about the E below low C (E2) to the F above middle C (F4)
 Description: A young man (regardless of the age of the singer).

/ Bassbuffo / Lyric buffo 

 English equivalent: lyric comic bass
 Range: From about the E half an octave below low C (E2) to the F above middle C (F4)
 Roles:
 Don Alfonso, Così fan tutte (Wolfgang Amadeus Mozart)
 Don Pasquale, Don Pasquale (Gaetano Donizetti)
 Dottor Dulcamara, L'elisir d'amore (Gaetano Donizetti)
 Don Bartolo, Il barbiere di Siviglia (Gioachino Rossini)
 Don Magnifico, La Cenerentola (Gioachino Rossini)
 Leporello, Don Giovanni (Wolfgang Amadeus Mozart)
 The Sacristan Tosca (Giacomo Puccini)

/ Dramatic buffo 

 English equivalent: dramatic comic bass
 Range: From about the C two octaves below middle C (C2) to the F above middle C (F4)
 Roles:
 Baron Ochs auf Lerchenau, Der Rosenkavalier (Richard Strauss)
 Daland, Der fliegende Holländer (Richard Wagner)
 Méphistophélès, Faust (Charles Gounod)

English equivalent: low bass. Italian: basso profondo.
 Range: From about the C two octaves below middle C (C2) to the F above middle C (F4)
 Basso profondo is the lowest bass voice type. According to J. B. Steane in Voices, Singers, and Critics, the basso profondo voice "derives from a method of tone-production that eliminates the more Italian quick vibrato. In its place is a kind of tonal solidity, a wall-like front, which may nevertheless prove susceptible to the other kind of vibrato, the slow beat or dreaded wobble."
 Roles:
 Don Bartolo, Le nozze di Figaro (Wolfgang Amadeus Mozart)
 Fiesco, Simon Boccanegra (Giuseppe Verdi)
 Padre Guardiano, La forza del destino (Giuseppe Verdi)
 Pimen, Boris Godunov (Modest Mussorgsky)
 Rocco, Fidelio (Ludwig van Beethoven)
 Sarastro, Die Zauberflöte (Wolfgang Amadeus Mozart)
 Sir Morosus, Die schweigsame Frau (Richard Strauss)
 Sparafucile, Rigoletto (Giuseppe Verdi)

English equivalent: dramatic low bass. Dramatic basso profundo is a powerful basso profundo voice.
 Range: From about the C two octaves below middle C (C2) to the F above middle C (F4)
 Roles:
 Il Commendatore (Don Pedro), Don Giovanni (Wolfgang Amadeus Mozart)
 Fafner, Das Rheingold, Siegfried (Richard Wagner)
 The Grand Inquisitor, Don Carlos (Giuseppe Verdi)
 Gurnemanz, Titurel, Parsifal (Richard Wagner)
 Heinrich, Lohengrin (Richard Wagner)
 Marke, Tristan und Isolde (Richard Wagner)

References

Bibliography 

 McGinnis, Pearl Yeadon. The opera singer’s career guide: understanding the European Fach system, edited by Marith McGinnis Willis. (Scarecrow Press, 2010) 
 Midgette, Anne (6 May 2007), "Home in the Range? Who Can Sing What". The New York Times. Retrieved 1 November 2012.
 Steane, J. B. "Fach" in The New Grove Dictionary of Opera, ed. Stanley Sadie (London, 1992) 

Opera terminology
Music classification